Ada Airport  is a privately owned, public-use airport located one nautical mile (1.85 km) northwest of the central business district of Ada, a village in Hardin County, Ohio, United States.

Facilities and aircraft 
It has one runway designated 09/27 with a turf surface measuring 1,955 by 110 feet (596 x 34 m). The airport is unattended.

For the 12-month period ending July 8, 2008, the airport had 555 aircraft operations, an average of 46 per month: 99% general aviation and 1% military. At that time there were 17 aircraft based at this airport: 82% single-engine and 18% ultralight.

Remarks:
 Deer on and in the vicinity of airport.
 Marked pline  from runway 27 threshold.
 Ultralight activity on and in the vicinity of airport.
 Built before 1959.

References

External links 
 Aerial photo as of 4 April 1994 from USGS The National Map

Airports in Ohio
Buildings and structures in Hardin County, Ohio
Transportation in Hardin County, Ohio